Magnus Carl Hedman (born 19 March 1973) is a Swedish former professional footballer who played as a goalkeeper. Beginning his career with AIK in 1990, he went on play in the English Premier League, Scottish Premier League, and Italian Serie A before retiring in 2005. He played 58 matches for the Sweden national team, and represented his country at the 1994 and 2002 FIFA World Cups, as well as UEFA Euro 2000 and 2004. He was awarded Guldbollen in 2000 as Sweden's best footballer of the year.

Club career

Early career 
Hedman was born in Botkyrka, and began his footballing career with Vårby Gårds IF and IFK Stockholm. He signed with AIK in 1987 and made his Allsvenskan debut for the club during the 1990 Allsvenskan season at only 17 years of age. He won the 1992 Allsvenskan championship with AIK and eventually moved abroad to play for English club Coventry City in July 1997.

Coventry City 
Aged 24 on 13 December 1997, Hedman debuted in a 4-0 win over Tottenham Hotspur and only lost his place again in February due to injury. Steve Ogrizovic however was on top form on his return and kept the number 1 shirt almost to the end of the season, Hedman returned for the final three league matches. Hedman made 17 appearances in his first season at Coventry City. Hedman began the 1998-99 campaign as number 1 keeper. Now 41, Ogrizovic was restricted to just two games and Hedman made 42 appearances in all competitions.

Hedman remained number 1 in Ogrizovic's final campaign during 1999-2000. The next season saw youngster Chris Kirkland take the shirt from Hedman, but the Sky Blues were relegated from the Premier League during that campaign. Hedman regained his place following Kirkland's transfer to Liverpool after a single game of the 2001–02 season. Hedmans Coventry City career came to an acrimonious conclusion towards the end of that season, when he was approached on the pitch during an away match against Preston North End on 6 April 2002 by a 'fan' who was questioning his commitment to the club.

Celtic, loan at Ancona, and retirement 
In the summer 2002 Hedman moved to Celtic in the Scottish Premier League. Hedman made 36 appearances for Celtic in three years, but due to injuries he failed to make a major impact on the number 1 spot, where Rab Douglas and later David Marshall were favoured by manager Martin O'Neill.

In January 2004 he had a loan spell at Italian team A.C. Ancona in Serie A. Hedman only played in three games, and it was a time in which he later claimed to have witnessed bribery on part of his Ancona teammates. He returned to Celtic, and played against FC Barcelona and A.C. Milan in the Champions League group stage, before being released by the club in July 2005. He retired from professional football a month later.

Return to England
On 9 November 2006, it was announced that Hedman would join reigning Premier League champions Chelsea on a week's trial, due to Chelsea's current lack of fully fit goalkeepers except for Henrique Hilário and youth team keeper Yves Ma-Kalambay. The move was eventually completed on 14 November 2006, with Hedman taking the number 22 shirt previously worn by Eiður Guðjohnsen. At the end of the season Hedman was released from his contract, having made no official appearances for the club.

IK Frej 
He was the goalkeeping coach for then third-tier club IK Frej.
On 21 June 2013, he made a one-match comeback and played 90 minutes in Frej's 3–1 victory against Selånger FK.

International career 
Hedman was chosen as a backup for first-choice keeper Thomas Ravelli in Sweden's squad at the 1994 World Cup alongside Lasse Eriksson. He debuted for the Swedish national team in February 1997, and was chosen for the Swedish squad at the Euro 2000 where he played all Sweden's matches and conceded goals from Bart Goor and Emile Mpenza against Belgium and from Luigi Di Biagio and Alessandro Del Piero against Italy (both lost 2–1). The other match, against Turkey, was 0–0 draw. He won the 2000 Guldbollen award. He also played full-time for Sweden at the 2002 World Cup. He was chosen to represent Sweden at the Euro 2004, where he served as a back-up for keeper Andreas Isaksson.

Personal life
He is divorced from Magdalena Graaf, a Swedish author, former model and pop singer. The couple have two sons together, including singer Lancelot.

Career statistics

International

Honours 
AIK
 Allsvenskan: 1992
 Svenska Cupen: 1995–96, 1996–97

Celtic
 Scottish Premier League: 2003–04
 Scottish Cup: 2003–04, 2004–05
Sweden

 FIFA World Cup third place: 1994
Individual
 Stor Grabb: 1999
 Guldbollen: 2000

Notes

External links
Swedish national football team 2004 profile

1973 births
Living people
Doping cases in association football
Swedish sportspeople in doping cases
People from Huddinge Municipality
Association football goalkeepers
Swedish footballers
Sweden international footballers
Sweden youth international footballers
Sweden under-21 international footballers
Swedish expatriate footballers
Expatriate footballers in England
Expatriate footballers in Scotland
Expatriate footballers in Italy
Swedish expatriate sportspeople in Italy
Swedish expatriate sportspeople in the United Kingdom
IFK Stockholm players
AIK Fotboll players
Coventry City F.C. players
Celtic F.C. players
A.C. Ancona players
Chelsea F.C. players
Premier League players
English Football League players
Scottish Premier League players
Serie A players
Allsvenskan players
1994 FIFA World Cup players
UEFA Euro 2000 players
2002 FIFA World Cup players
UEFA Euro 2004 players
Sportspeople from Stockholm County